Edward Hubbard can refer to:

 Edward Hubbard (1937-1989), English architectural historian
 Edward Hubbard (cricketer) (1906-1969), Australian cricketer
 Edward Hubbard (priest) (1708-1741), English priest
 Edward L. Hubbard (born 1938), retired American Air Force officer
 Eddie Hubbard (1917-2007), American radio personality